Lyon Creek is a stream in Geary, Dickinson and Marion counties, Kansas, in the United States.

Lyon Creek was named in the 1850s for Capt. Nathaniel Lyon.

See also
List of rivers of Kansas

References

Rivers of Dickinson County, Kansas
Rivers of Geary County, Kansas
Rivers of Marion County, Kansas
Rivers of Kansas